Hans Carl Friedrich von Mangoldt (1854 in Weimar– 1925 in Danzig) was a German mathematician who contributed to the solution of the prime number theorem.

Biography
Mangoldt completed his Doctorate of Philosophy (Ph.D) in 1878 at the University of Berlin, where his supervisors were Ernst Kummer and Karl Weierstrass. He contributed to the solution of the prime number theorem by providing rigorous proofs of two statements in Bernhard Riemann's seminal paper "On the Number of Primes Less Than a Given Magnitude". Riemann himself had only given partial proofs of these statements. Mangoldt worked as professor at the RWTH Aachen and was succeeded by Otto Blumenthal.

See also 
 Prime-counting function
 Cartan–Hadamard theorem
 Riemann–von Mangoldt formula
 Von Mangoldt function

Notes 

1854 births
1925 deaths
19th-century German mathematicians
20th-century German mathematicians
Number theorists
Academic staff of RWTH Aachen University
Scientists from Weimar